Matthew Montagu, 4th Baron Rokeby (23 November 1762 – 1 September 1831), FRS, known as Matthew Robinson until 1776, was a British Member of Parliament, and briefly a baronet and Peer of the Realm.

Early life
Montagu was born Matthew Robinson on 23 November 1762 and was baptised in the parish of St Andrew Holborn. He was the second son of Jane ( Greenland) Robinson and Morris Robinson, an attorney of the Six Clerks Office in Chancery of London. He was the younger brother of Morris Robinson, 3rd Baron Rokeby and nephew of Matthew Robinson, 2nd Baron Rokeby.

He was the favoured nephew of Elizabeth (Robinson) Montagu (widow of Edward Montagu, grandson of the Edward Montagu, 1st Earl of Sandwich), at whose request he took the name of Montagu on 3 June 1776 by Royal Licence in advance of inheriting her estate at Sandleford Priory in Berkshire and elsewhere.

He was educated at Harrow School from 1775 to 1780 and Trinity College, Cambridge in 1780.

Career
A "faithful follower of Pitt", Montagu represented the Cornish constituencies of Bossiney (1786–1790) and Tregony (1790–1795) in the Parliament of Great Britain; and St Germans (1806–1812) in the Parliament of the United Kingdom.

Montagu was a friend and supporter of William Wilberforce, and thus favoured the abolition of the slave trade.
Wilberforce stayed at Sandleford from 27th to the 28th of July, 1789:
27th. Set off for Bath and reached Sandleford. The old lady [Elizabeth Montagu] wonderfully spirited, are all very kind in their reception. 28th. Almost compelled to stay with the Montagus all day. Mrs. Montagu senior has many fine, and great, and amiable qualities. Young Montagu all gratitude and respect and affection to her and of most upright and pure intentions.
Wilberforce was at Sandleford one night in July 1791:
Monday 28 July. Off betimes on Sierra Leone business-reached Sandleford (M. Montagu's) in the evening. Dr. Beattie was already arrived.

In 1829, he succeeded his brother as 4th Baron Rokeby in the Irish peerage and the 6th Baronet of Rokeby Park.

Fellow of the Royal Society
Montagu was elected a fellow in 1795. His proposers were Arden, Lucas Pepys, J. Rennell, John Sinclair, G. Shuckburgh Evelyn, William Marsden, George, 16th Earl of Morton, Pat Russell, George Atwood, John Henniker Major, and C. F. Greville.

Personal life

On 9 July 1785, Montagu married Elizabeth Charlton, daughter and heir of Francis Charlton of Kent. Before her death, she bore him six sons and seven daughters, including:

 Edward Montagu, 5th Baron Rokeby (1787–1847), who died unmarried in Naples.
 Henry Robinson-Montagu, 6th Baron Rokeby (1798–1883), who married Magdalen ( Huxley) Croft, the daughter of Thomas Huxley and widow of Frederick Croft.
 Hon. John Montagu (d. 1848), a Lieutenant-Colonel in the Coldstream Guards.
 Hon. Elizabeth Montagu (d. 1875), who married Charles Oldfield Bowles, son of Oldfield Bowles, in 1815.
 Hon. Catherine Montagu (d. 1865), who married Edward Goulburn, son of Munbee Goulburn and Hon. Susannah Chetwynd (a daughter of the 4th Viscount Chetwynd), in 1831.
 Hon. Spencer Dudley Montagu (1807–1882), a cricketer who married Anna Louisa Flint, a daughter of Sir C. W. Flint, in 1842. They divorced and he then married Henrietta Elizabeth Harriet Pemberton, a daughter of C. R. Pemberton, in 1868.
 Hon. Caroline Montagu (d. 1867), who married William Godolphin Osborne, son of Francis Osborne, 1st Baron Godolphin, in 1843.
 Hon. Jane Montagu (d. 1857), who married politician Henry Goulburn, also a son of Munbee Goulburn and Hon. Susannah Chetwynd, in 1811.
 Hon. Mary Montagu (d. 1877), who married Col. Robert Ellison of the Grenadier Guards in 1820.
 Hon. Eleanor Montagu (d. 1847), who married politician John-Nicholas Fazakerley in 1822.
 Hon. Emily Montague (d. 1832), who died unmarried.

His wife died on died 7 March 1817, before he succeeded to the barony. Lord Rokeby died at Montagu House, Portman Square on 1 September 1831. He was succeeded in his titles by his eldest son, Edward. Upon Edward's death in Naples in 1847, the titles passed to his younger son Henry upon whose death the baronetcy and barony became extinct.

References

1762 births
1831 deaths
People from Newbury, Berkshire
People educated at Harrow School
Alumni of Trinity College, Cambridge
Montagu, Matthew
Barons in the Peerage of Ireland
People associated with Sandleford, Berkshire
Montagu, Matthew
Montagu, Matthew
Montagu, Matthew
Montagu, Matthew
Montagu, Matthew
UK MPs who inherited peerages
Fellows of the Royal Society